Michael Fape is an Anglican archbishop in Nigeria:  he is the current Bishop of Remo and Archbishop of the Ecclesiastical Province of Lagos.

Fape was educated at the University of Ibadan  and ordained in 1984.  He was made a Canon in Ibadan Diocese in 1995 and an Archdeacon in 1997.  He became a bishop in  2003; and an archbishop in 2016. He was enthroned as Bishop of Remo in 2004.

Notes

Living people
Anglican bishops of Remo
Anglican archbishops of Lagos
21st-century Anglican bishops in Nigeria
21st-century Anglican archbishops
University of Ibadan alumni
Year of birth missing (living people)
Church of Nigeria archdeacons